Gothic Kabbalah is the thirteenth full-length album by Swedish symphonic metal group Therion. It was released in Europe on 12 January 2007. The album was mixed by Stefan Glaumann, who also contributed to bands such as Rammstein, Evergrey, Europe and Def Leppard. The main line-up has been slightly changed since previous studio albums (Lemuria and Sirius B): Petter Karlsson returned to play drums, having already played with the band during Lemuria / Sirius B tour during the period of 2004–2006. Since Christofer Johnsson announced in 2006 he is retiring from singing, vocals on Gothic Kabbalah were performed by Mats Levén, as well as Snowy Shaw and three female singers: Katarina Lilja, Anna Nyhlin and Hannah Holgersson.

The album is based on concepts from the life of 17th-century esoteric scholar Johannes Bureus.

Track listing
All lyrics by Thomas Karlsson. Music as indicated:

Vinyl release
Gothic Kabbalah has been also released as limited edition double LP vinyl (180 gram; 33⅓ rpm). It features colored vinyl, gatefold cover and it has been released in 1000 hand-numbered copies.

Reception

The album has received generally good reviews from critics, including Chronicles of Chaos and Allmusic hailing it as "the first truly great rock opera of the 21st century".

The album was the band's first to enter the Swedish Albums Chart.

Chart positions

Personnel
 Christofer Johnsson –  keyboards, programming, guitar
 Kristian Niemann – lead and rhythm guitars, keyboards
 Johan Niemann – bass guitar, guitar, acoustic guitar
 Petter Karlsson – drums, guitar, keyboards, solo ("Chain of Minerva", "T.O.F. - The Trinity") and choral vocals, percussion

Guest musicians
 Mats Levén – lead vocals ("Der Mitternachtslöwe" (choir), "Gothic Kabbalah", "Perennial Sophia", "Son of the Staves of Time", "Close up the Streams", "Three Treasures",  "T.O.F. - Trinity", "Adulruna Rediviva"), guitar
 Snowy Shaw – lead vocals ("Der Mitternachtslöwe" (choir), "Perennial Sophia" (choir), "Wisdom and the Cage", "Tuna 1613", "Trul" (choir), "Close up the Streams" (choir), "Wand of Abaris", "Three Treasures", "Adulruna Rediviva")
 Katarina Lilja – vocals ("Gothic Kabbalah", "Perennial Sophia", "Trul", "Close up the Streams", "The Falling Stone", "Chain of Minerva")
 Hannah Holgersson – vocals, soprano ("Der Mitternachtslöwe", "Wisdom and the Cage", "Son of the Staves of Time", "Trul" (choir), "Wand of Abaris" (choir), "T.O.F. - Trinity", "Chain of Minerva", "Adulruna Rediviva")
 Jonas Samuelsson–Nerbe – tenor ("Tuna 1613", "Path to Arcady", "Adulruna Rediviva")
 Anna Nyhlin – solo soprano on "The Falling Stone" and "Path to Arcady"
 Karin Fjellander – choral soprano
 Ken Hensley – Hammond organ
 Joakim Svalberg – Hammond organ
 Rolf Pilotti – solo flute on "Gothic Kabbalah" and "Trul"
 Stefan Glaumann – tambourine

Others
 Sanken Sandqvist – engineering
 Thomas Ewerhard – design

Singles

Notes

External links
 Information about album at the official website
 Ecard at Nuclear Blast USA
 Stream previews at Nuclear Blast Europe
 
 Gothic Kabbalah at MusicBrainz: disc one, disc two

2007 albums
Therion (band) albums
Nuclear Blast albums